The botija (botijuela; bunga) is a Caribbean musical instrument of the aerophone type. The botija is a potbellied earthenware jug or jar with two openings and was used in the early son sextetos in Cuba as a bass instrument.

Origin
The botija was used to hold kerosene brought from Spain. Botijas were then used to hide money underground and were buried to prevent humidity from reaching the floors. Later, botijas were dug up and used as musical instruments in the late 19th century in the Caribbean island of Cuba.

Use in Cuban son
Cuban son originated in eastern Cuba in the late 19th century. The music's defining characteristic was a pulsing or anticipated bass that falls between the downbeat, leading to the creation of many bass instruments including the botija. Other instruments included a marímbula, serrucho, contrabajo and bajo.   Other bass instruments were used according to the size of the musical arrangement or timbre of the bass instrument needed. The marímbula, for example, was used mainly for smaller ensembles because it was not easily heard, whereas the bajo, an electrical bass, could be easily projected and heard over many other instruments.

The botijas contained two openings, one at the top and one of the side, and were blown into to create bass notes. To create specific pitches, they were filled to specific levels with water.   Another technique includes inserting a reed into the opening while the player blows into the reed.

Use of the botija throughout parts of Cuba ended after the early 20th century and was replaced by the double bass.

In popular culture 

In Brazil, there is an expression called "pego(a) com a boca na botija" (caught with his/her mouth on the milk jug), with similar meaning as "caught with his hand in the cookie jar".

See also
Udu
Ghatam
Son

References 

Caribbean musical instruments
Cuban musical instruments
Plosive aerophones
Changüí